Rebisi is a traditional kingdom of the Ikwerre people in what is today Nigeria. It is located in Port Harcourt (local government area) and comprises the localities of Oroabali, Orolozu, Orogbum, Oroworukwo, Orochiri, Oromeruezimgbu and Oroada.

The traditional ruler who is also the paramount king of Port Harcourt is the occupant of the Eze Apara Rebisi stool and serves as the intermediary between the Rebisi people of Port Harcourt and the government.

History of Rebisi

 
Rebisi people descend from the Arochukwu expansion, it is thought that a man name rebisi of aro origin led the first wave of settlers and later accompanied by a wave of settlers from the Benin kingdom and surrounding tribes. The Rebisi people still speak a dialect of the Igbo Language and share common customs too.

List of rulers of Rebisi

 HRM Eze Elikwu Ekaninwo, Eze Apara Rebisi IV
 HRM Eze Elikwu Ekaninwo Mati, Eze Apara Rebisi V
 HRM Eze Elikwu Woruji, Eze Apara Rebisi VI
 HRM Eze Elikwu Dike, Eze Apara Rebisi VII
 HRM Eze Elikwu Worluchem, Eze Apara Rebisi VIII
 HRM Eze Phillip Elikwu, Eze Apara Rebisi IX
 HRM Eze Victor Weli Woluchem, Eze Apara Rebisi X
 HRM Eze Sunday Nnanta Woluchem, Eze Apara Rebisi XI
 HRM Eze Victor Nnanna Woluchem II, Eze Apara Rebisi XII

References

Port Harcourt (local government area)
Ikwerre people
Monarchies of Africa